The Filipino labor leader of the early 1940s to the mid-1960s.

He is also the inspiration for the character Claro in the book America Is in the Heart, a restaurant owner that educates the main character in the ways of politics.

Filipino trade union leaders
Year of birth missing
Possibly living people
Place of birth missing